Angelo Tartaglia (born 30 September 1992) is an Italian footballer who plays as a defender for Monterosi.

Career
Born in Naples, Campania, Tartaglia started his career at Italian Serie D club Viribus Unitis, located within Naples metropolitan area. On 6 July 2011 he was signed by Italian third division Andria (along with Meccariello), which Tartaglia scored in his league debut on 6 May 2012.

Tartaglia played 11 games in 2012–13 Lega Pro Prima Divisione season. Tartaglia became a free agent after Andria bankrupted in summer 2013.

Parma
In July 2013 Tartaglia was signed by Parma F.C. on free transfer. On 5 July 2013 he was farmed to Gubbio along with Sarr, Cacchioli and Baccolo. On 22 July 2014 Tartaglia, Caccavallo, Bussi and Deli were signed by Paganese in temporary deal from Parma.

On 21 July 2015, he joined Fidelis Andria on free transfer.

Triestina
On 29 January 2020, Tartaglia moved to Triestina.

Monterosi
On 26 August 2021, he signed a two-year contract with Monterosi.

References

External links
 AIC profile (data by football.it) 
 

Italian footballers
S.S. Fidelis Andria 1928 players
A.S. Gubbio 1910 players
Paganese Calcio 1926 players
Novara F.C. players
U.S. Triestina Calcio 1918 players
Monterosi Tuscia F.C. players
Serie B players
Serie C players
Association football defenders
Footballers from Naples
1992 births
Living people